Xymenopsis corrugata is a species of sea snail, a marine gastropod mollusc in the family Muricidae, the murex snails or rock snails. They reproduce sexually.

Distribution
Xymenopsis corrugata is found off Tierra del Fuego in southern Chile.

References

Gastropods described in 1845
Xymenopsis
Endemic fauna of Chile